Cannata is an Italian surname. Notable people with the surname include:

Giovanni Cannata (born 1985), Italian-German footballer
Jeff Cannata, American musician
Joe Cannata (born 1990), American ice hockey player
Loredana Cannata (born 1975), Italian actress
Richie Cannata, American musician and music producer

Italian-language surnames